Renault Nissan Automotive India Private Limited is the Indian joint venture of Renault and Nissan and part of the Renault–Nissan–Mitsubishi Alliance.

History
Renault Nissan Automotive India Private Limited was established in 2005.

Manufacturing facilities
Renault Nissan Automotive India Private Limited have their manufacturing plant in Oragadam near Chennai. The plant has a capacity of 480,000 vehicles per annum. The capacity is divided equally between Renault India Private Limited and Nissan Motor India. 
Renault is constructing a small car powered by an 800cc engine, to compete with Maruti Suzuki's Alto, Hyundai India's Eon and Chevrolet's Spark, in the segment, that makes up for about 40–45% of India's car market. RNAIPL has achieved production target of 5,00,000 lakhs vehicle in the month of October 2013 in the short span of 40 months after start of production.. 
RNAIPL is one of the most profitable company which adopts Japanese manufacturing policy of GENBA KANRI. The company works on the style of maximum productivity with minimum resources. But, in due course this manufacturing strategy sometimes frustrates its employees. The small car is likely to be rolled out from the Renault Nissan Alliance plant in Chennai and to hit the market in 2014–15.

In August 2015, RNAIPL put on hold its plans invest ₹5,000 Cr. in India due to non-payment of Investment Promotion Subsidies (IPS) promised by Tamil Nadu. The company claimed that it yet to receive a refund of ₹1,901 Cr and ₹ 822 Cr for IPS and input VAT respectively.

Technical Center
Renault Nissan Technical Business Center India (RNTBCI) located at Mahindra World City, in Chengalpattu, Chennai is one of Nissan and Renault's Global Technical and Development Center. This unit is engaged in shared product development services for Renault and Nissan entities worldwide.

Models

Renault

Current Models

Discontinued Models 
 Renault Fluence (2011–2017)
 Renault Koleos (2011–2017)
 Renault Pulse (2012–2018)
 Renault Scala (2012–2018)
 Renault Duster (2012–2022)
 Renault Lodgy (2015–2020)
 Renault Captur (2017–2020)

Nissan

Current models

Discontinued models 
Nissan X-Trail (2005–2014)
Nissan Teana (2006–2014)
Nissan Micra (2010–2020)
Nissan 370Z (2011–2013)
Nissan Sunny (2011–2020)
Nissan Evalia (2012–2017)
Nissan Terrano (2013–2020)
Nissan GT-R (2016–2022)
Nissan Kicks (2019–2023)

Datsun

Discontinued models 
Datsun Go  (2014–2022)
Datsun Go+  (2015–2022)
Datsun redi-Go  (2016–2022)

Sales and service network

RIPL
As of 2015, Renault India has 224 outlets in India.

NMIPL
As of September 2015, Nissan Motor India has 201 dealerships across 148 cities in India.

See also 
Nissan Motor Company
Renault S.A.
Mahindra Renault Limited
Automobile industry in India

References

External links 
 

Car manufacturers of India
Manufacturing companies based in Chennai
Vehicle manufacturing companies established in 2010
Indian subsidiaries of foreign companies
2010 establishments in Tamil Nadu
Indian companies established in 2010
Vehicle manufacturing companies